Conor McCormack (born 18 May 1990) is a professional footballer currently playing in the League of Ireland First Division with Galway United.

Club career
He started his career with Manchester United, joining on a youth contract when he was 16 years old. After spending two years at the club and becoming disillusioned with the lack of first-team opportunities, McCormack turned down the offer of an extension to his contract. He moved to Italy and joined Serie B side U.S. Triestina Calcio. McCormack did not make a first-team start during his two and a half years there. After a proposed loan deal to a Lega Pro side fell through at the last minute in May 2010, McCormack made his intentions to leave clear. He returned to Ireland to sign for League of Ireland champions Shamrock Rovers at the beginning of the 2011 season, playing a role in their journey to the Europa League group stages.

In 2012, McCormack signed for a further 2 seasons.

McCormack signed for League of Ireland champions, St Patrick's Athletic for the 2014 season in November 2013. He scored his first goal for Pats on his debut in a 4–1 win over Shelbourne in a friendly at Pearse Park on 1 February 2014. After 58 appearances for Pats, McCormack was released by mutual consent on 28 July 2015 and was announced as a new signing for relegation fighting Derry City later that day.

He signed with Cork City on 18 November 2016 by manager John Caulfield. Cork City had recently won the Irish Daily Mail FAI Cup and McCormack played a role in Cork's League of Ireland title win ahead of Dundalk the following season.

He played with Derry City in 2020.

McCormack signed for Galway United ahead of the 2021 season.

International career
McCormack has previously captained the Republic of Ireland Youths team and has caps from Under 15, Under 16, Under 17 and Under 19 levels. He was the recipient of the Republic of Ireland Under-17 Player of the Year award for 2007.

Honours
Cork City
League of Ireland Premier Division (1): 2017
FAI Cup (1): 2017
President's Cup (2): 2017, 2018
Munster Senior Cup (1): 2017

Shamrock Rovers
League of Ireland Premier Division (1): 2011
League of Ireland Cup (1): 2013
Setanta Sports Cup (2): 2011, 2013
Leinster Senior Cup (2): 2012, 2013

St Patrick's Athletic
FAI Cup (1): 2014
FAI President's Cup (1): 2014
Leinster Senior Cup (1): 2014

Career statistics 
Professional appearances – correct as of 13 April 2022.

References

External links

1990 births
Living people
Republic of Ireland association footballers
U.S. Triestina Calcio 1918 players
Shamrock Rovers F.C. players
St Patrick's Athletic F.C. players
Derry City F.C. players
Cork City F.C. players
Galway United F.C. players
League of Ireland players
Association football midfielders
Republic of Ireland youth international footballers
Expatriate footballers in Italy
Republic of Ireland expatriate association footballers
Association footballers from County Louth